Hellbrunn is Landschaftsraum in Salzburg, Salzburgerland, Austria.

Location

It is in the south of the city, being limited by the north with Fürstenweg, in the west limits with the Hellbrunner Schlossmauer, in the east with the Salzach river and in the south it's limited by Anif.

Surrounds 
In this Lanschaftsraum can be found the Schloss Hellbrunn with the Schlosspark.

Here is also the Salzburg Zoo, whose main address is in Aigen.

Zones 

Hellbrunn is divided in two zones: Schlosspark Hellbrunn and Hellbrunner.

See also

 Salzburg
 Salzburgerland

Districts of Salzburg